Joseph Dan (1935 – 23 July 2022) was an Israeli scholar of Jewish mysticism.  He taught for over 40 years in the Department of Jewish Thought at the Hebrew University of Jerusalem.  He was the first incumbent of the Gershom Scholem Chair in Jewish Mysticism at The Hebrew University.

Biography
Dan was born in 1935 in Budapest, Hungary, from where, at the age of four, he and his family fled out of fear of Nazism, settling later in Jerusalem. All the biographical documents about Joseph Dan (including his own website) give his birthplace as Bratislava, Slovakia, a version created by his father to escape repatriation by the British government in Palestine.

In the Hebrew University of Jerusalem, Dan began a double major in Assyriology and Jewish Thought. Under the influence of the revered teacher Gershom Scholem, he was attracted towards Jewish mysticism. He received his doctorate in 1964 under the guidance of Isaiah Tishby, his thesis titled The Speculative Basis of the Ethical Teachings of Chassidei Ashkenaz.

Having written more than 60 books, he had published by the time of his death the first thirteen volumes of a project titled "Toledot Torat Hasod Ha'ivrit" ("History of Hebraic Mysticism and Esotericism", Zalman Shazar Center, Jerusalem), which he described as "an attempt by one individual to write the entire history of Jewish mysticism: not some executive summary, but rather a full-blown academic survey abridgment for executives but with academic detail".

Awards
In 1997, Dan was awarded the Israel Prize, for Jewish thought.

See also
List of Israel Prize recipients

References

External links
Joseph Dan's web page (archived)
Interview with Joseph Dan in Haaretz
A comprehensive History of Jewish Mysticism, Kabbalah, a newsletter of current research in Jewish mysticism, Volume 2, Number 3, Fall/Winter 1987, Tevet 5748, Jerusalem, pp. 1, 6 - 8, on Academia.edu. Interview.]
Books written by Joseph Dan
Articles written by Joseph Dan
Israeli interview with Joseph Dan on the beginning of the Bible (Hebrew video)

1935 births
2022 deaths
People from Budapest
Academic staff of the Hebrew University of Jerusalem
Israel Prize in Jewish thought recipients
Israeli Jews
Hungarian Jews
Jewish mysticism
Judaic scholars
Kabbalah
Hungarian emigrants to Israel
Israeli people of Hungarian-Jewish descent